pcupdate = 14.30u, 10 maart 2023 (UTC)

Brian Campman (born 12 December 1999) is a Dutch football player who plays for Oss '20.

Club career
He made his professional debut in the Eerste Divisie for Achilles '29 on 18 November 2016 in a game against FC Oss.

In the summer 2017, Campman joined NEC. He started out at the U19 squad.

References

External links
 Profile - Voetbal International
 
 

1999 births
Living people
People from Duiven
Association football forwards
Dutch footballers
Achilles '29 players
Eerste Divisie players
Footballers from Gelderland
NEC Nijmegen players